Dominik Robin Schmid (born 10 March 1998) is a Swiss professional footballer who plays as a midfielder for Grasshoppers and the Switzerland national football team.

Career 
Schmid started his youth football with FC Kaiseraugst but transferred early to FC Basel. He advanced through their youth system until 2015 as he joined their U-21 team. On 10 March 2017 (his 19th Birthday he signed a three and a half year professional contract and joined their first team during their 2016–17 season under head coach Urs Fischer. He played his domestic league debut in their first team in the away game in the Letzigrund on 28 May 2017 as Basel won 3–1 against Grasshopper Club.

Under trainer Urs Fischer Schmid played just that one League game but the team won the Swiss Super League championship at the end of the 2016–17 Super League season. For the club this was the eighth title in a row and their 20th championship title in total. They also won the Swiss Cup for the twelfth time, which meant they had won the double for the sixth time in the club's history.

Schmid started their 2017–18 season with Basel's first team and had three league appearances in the early stages, but the only game where he played the full 90 minutes was the 2017–18 Swiss Cup match against amateur club FC Wettswil-Bonstetten. To gain more match experience he played in the U-21 team. During the winter break he was loaned to Lausanne-Sport, where he signed a contract over 18 months. Lausanne suffered relegation and Schmid had only been playing sporadicly, so the loan was ended early after just 12 months. Then, on 15 January 2019. Schmid was loaned out to FC Wil in the Challenge League for the rest of the season. With Wil Schmid played regularly and so the loan was extended another six months. Following this loan period Schmid left Basel. During his time with the club, Schmid played a total of 14 games for Basel scoring one goal. Four of these games were in the Swiss Super League, one in the Swiss Cup and nine were friendly games. He scored his one goal during the test games.

In August 2020, Schmid transferred to Grasshopper Club Zürich in the Swiss Challenge League, signing a three-year contract. He quickly became an integral part of the club and was instrumental in helping the record champion achieve promotion back to the Swiss Super League. On 24 November 2021, he extended his contract until 2024. He was voted Player of the Season by the fans of Grasshopper for the 2021-22 season.

International Career 
Schmid has played in all youth teams for Switzerland. 

On 16 March 2023, he received his first call up to the Switzerland national football team in preparation for their upcoming UEFA Euro qualifying campaign.

Honours 
FC Basel
 Swiss Super League: 2016–17
 Swiss Cup winner: 2016–17
Grasshopper Club Zürich
 Swiss Challenge League: 2020-21
 Player of the Season: 2021-22

References

External links
 Profile season 2017/18 on the Swiss Football League homepage
 Profile at FC Basel
 U-20 National Team profile

1998 births
People from Rheinfelden District
Living people
Swiss men's footballers
Association football midfielders
Switzerland youth international footballers
Switzerland under-21 international footballers
Switzerland international footballers
FC Basel players
FC Lausanne-Sport players
FC Wil players
Grasshopper Club Zürich players
Swiss Super League players
Swiss Challenge League players
Sportspeople from Aargau